Mark Carlson may refer to:
Mark Carlson (composer) (born 1952), musician
Mark Carlson (engineer) (born 1955), software engineer
Mark Carlson (ice hockey) (born 1969), American ice hockey coach
Mark Carlson (offensive tackle) (born 1963), player for the 1987 Washington Redskins
Mark Carlson (quarterback), American football player 
Mark Carlson (umpire) (born 1969), American baseball umpire